The 2008 IAAF World Cross Country Championships took place on March 30, 2008.  The races were held at the Holyrood Park in Edinburgh, United Kingdom.  Four races took place, one for men, women, junior men and junior women respectively. All races encompassed both individual and team competition. This was the year in which Kenenisa Bekele became the first athlete in World Cross history to win six individual long course titles, breaking his tie with John Ngugi and Paul Tergat who had each won five.  Reports of the event were given in The New York Times, in the Herald, and for the IAAF.

Medallists

Race results

Senior men's race (12 km)
Complete results for senior men and for senior men's teams were published.

Note: Athletes in parentheses did not score for the team result.

Junior men's race (7.905 km)
Complete results for junior men and for junior men's teams were published.

Note: Athletes in parentheses did not score for the team result.

Senior women's race (7.905 km)
Complete results for senior women and for senior women's teams were published.

Note: Athletes in parentheses did not score for the team result.

Junior women's race (6.04 km)
Complete results for junior women and for junior women's teams were published.

Note: Athletes in parentheses did not score for the team result.

Medal table (unofficial)

Note: Totals include both individual and team medals, with medals in the team competition counting as one medal.

Participation
According to an unofficial count, 448 athletes from 57 countries participated. This is in agreement with the official numbers as published.

 (16)
 (1)
 (22)
 (2)
 (7)
 (1)
 (6)
 (14)
 (1)
 (1)
 (26)
 (1)
 (4)
 (2)
 (2)
 (1)
 (2)
 (17)
 (27)
 (10)
 (1)
 (1)
 (1)
 (1)
 (21)
 (9)
 (26)
 (4)
 (27)
 (2)
 (2)
 (2)
 (3)
 (1)
 (21)
 (1)
 (4)
 (1)
 (1)
 (2)
 (18)
 (10)
 (11)
 (1)
 (1)
 (10)
 (23)
 (1)
 (3)
 (3)
 (13)
 (2)
 (27)
 (27)
 (1)
 (2)
 (1)

See also
 2008 IAAF World Cross Country Championships – Senior men's race
 2008 IAAF World Cross Country Championships – Junior men's race
 2008 IAAF World Cross Country Championships – Senior women's race
 2008 IAAF World Cross Country Championships – Junior women's race
 2008 in athletics (track and field)

References

External links
Official website
IAAF Site

 
World Athletics Cross Country Championships
Iaaf World Cross Country Championships, 2008
W
2000s in Edinburgh
International sports competitions in Edinburgh
Cross country running in the United Kingdom